In enzymology, a 4-hydroxycyclohexanecarboxylate dehydrogenase is an enzyme that catalyzes the chemical reaction

trans-4-hydroxycyclohexanecarboxylate + NAD+  4-oxocyclohexanecarboxylate + NADH + H+

Thus, the two substrates of this enzyme are trans-4-hydroxycyclohexanecarboxylate and NAD+, whereas its 3 products are 4-oxocyclohexanecarboxylate, NADH, and H+.

This enzyme belongs to the family of oxidoreductases, specifically those acting on the CH-OH group of donor with NAD+ or NADP+ as acceptor. The systematic name of this enzyme class is trans-4-hydroxycyclohexanecarboxylate:NAD+ 4-oxidoreductase. This enzyme is also called trans-4-hydroxycyclohexanecarboxylate dehydrogenase.

References

 

EC 1.1.1
NADH-dependent enzymes
Enzymes of unknown structure